Bürg is a prominent lunar impact crater in the northeast part of the Moon. It lies within the lava-flooded, ruined crater formation designated Lacus Mortis. To the south and southeast is the crater pair Plana and Mason. To the west, beyond the rim of Lacus Mortis, is the prominent crater Eudoxus.

Name
Bürg is named for Austrian astronomer Johann Tobias Bürg, who discovered Antares's companion star during an occultation event in 1819.

Crater
The rim of Bürg is nearly circular with relatively little wear. The interior is bowl-shaped, and there is a large central mountain at the midpoint. Along the crest of this mountain some observers have noted a small, crater-like pit. The crater has a ray system, and is consequently mapped as part of the Copernican System.

To the west is a rille system designated the Rimae Bürg, which spans a distance of about 100 kilometers.

Satellite craters
By convention these features are identified on lunar maps by placing the letter on the side of the crater midpoint that is closest to Bürg.

References

External links

 

Impact craters on the Moon